Josianne Fleming-Artsen (born 1949) is an educator and politician, who served as Minister Plenipotentiary of Sint Maarten from 2014 to 2015 and Deputy Minister Plenipotentiary of Sint Maarten from 2013 to 2014. She served as president of the University of St. Martin from 1999 to 2010.

References

Living people
Sint Maarten women in politics
Ministers plenipotentiary (Sint Maarten)
United People's Party (Sint Maarten) politicians
Place of birth missing (living people)
1949 births